Lomographa margarita is a moth in the family Geometridae. It is found in Taiwan and India.

References

Moths described in 1868
Lomographa
Moths of Asia
Moths of Taiwan